Iduna was an important literary association founded in May 1891 by a circle of writers around Fritz Lemmermayer. Lemmermayer acted as a sort of "middle man" between an older generation of authors (which included Fercher von Steinwand, Joseph Tandler, Auguste Hyrtl, Ludwig von Mertens, and Josephone von Knorr) and a group of younger writers and thinkers (which included Rudolf Steiner, Marie Eugenie delle Grazie, and Karl Maria Heidt). 

The society had the descriptive subtitle of "Free German Society for Literature". 

The name Iduna was provided by Guido von List himself and is that of a North Germanic goddess of eternal youth and renewal. 

Richard von Kralik and Joseph Kalasanz Poestion, authors with specifically neo-Germanic leanings, were also involved in the circle. 

The circle dissolved in 1893 when the 'Literarische Donaugesellschaft' (Danubian Literary Society) grew out of its ashes and was founded by Guido von List and Fanny Wschiansky.

Austrian writers' organisations